The FIBA 3x3 Asia Cup is the top basketball tournament in Asia for 3x3 national teams and was first held in 2013 as the FIBA Asia 3x3 Championship in Doha, Qatar. In the championship there are 2 events, men's and women's. Each team has 4 players (3 on court, 1 bench). The match is played on a half court and every rule applies as well as a 12-second shot clock and clearance needed on a new possession.

From 2019 to 2022, the tournament will be held in Changsha, China.

Results

Men's tournament

Women's tournament

Statistics

Men's tournament

Women's tournament

All tournaments

Participating nations - men

See also 
 FIBA 3x3 Under-18 Asian Championships
 FIBA Asia Cup
 FIBA Women's Asia Cup

References

 
Basketball competitions in Asia between national teams
3x3 basketball competitions
Asian championships
Recurring sporting events established in 2013
2013 establishments in Asia
Asia 3x3 Championships